Allan A. Goldstein (born May 23, 1949) is an American film director and screenwriter, perhaps best known for directing the Charles Bronson vehicle Death Wish V: The Face of Death and the Leslie Nielsen comedy 2001: A Space Travesty.

Filmography as director
 A Warehouse for Bodies (1979)
 7th Annual Young Comedians Show (1982) (TV)
 The Dining Room (1984) (TV)
 House of Dies Drear (1984) (TV)
 The Outside Chance of Maximilian Glick (1988)
 The Lawrenceville Stories (1988–89) (TV miniseries, episodes 2 & 3)
 Cold Front (1989)
 The Phone Call (1989) (TV)
 Chaindance (1991)
 Death Wish V: The Face of Death (1994)
 Memory Run (1995)
 Vents contraires (1995) (TV)
 Midnight Heat (1996) (TV)
 Virus (1996)
 Dog's Best Friend (1998) (TV)
 Loss of Faith (1998) (TV)
 Jungle Boy (1998)
 Home Team (1998)
 When Justice Fails (1999)
 2001: A Space Travesty (2000)
 One Way Out (2002)
 Pact with the Devil (2004)
 Fire (2004) (video)
 Snakeman (2005)
 Growing Up with Julian (filming)

References

External links
 

1949 births
Living people
Action film directors
American male screenwriters
Film directors from New York City
Male models from New York (state)
Screenwriters from New York (state)
Writers from Brooklyn